Hendrickson High School is a high school in the city of Pflugerville, Texas Travis County, Texas, United States, Pflugerville, Texas. It is operated by the Pflugerville Independent School District and is named after Pflugerville educator and civil servant Robert E. Hendrickson.

Notable alumni
Samaje Perine, American football running back
Hope Trautwein, American college softball pitcher

References

External links

High schools in Travis County, Texas
Public high schools in Texas